Véronique Fleury is a former French figure skater.  She was the 1996 silver medalist at the French Figure Skating Championships. She finished 17th at the 1996 European Championships and 31st at the World Championships.

Results

References

French female single skaters
Living people
Year of birth missing (living people)